Olivier Guéant is a French mathematician, focusing on mean field game theory and financial mathematics. He is currently a Full Professor of applied mathematics at the Université Paris 1 Panthéon Sorbonne.

Background 
Guéant studied mathematics and economics at Ecole Normale Supérieure and also studied at Harvard. He  defended the first PhD thesis on mean field games under the supervision of Pierre-Louis Lions. Guéant's PhD was awarded the Rosemont Demassieux prize.

In 2010, along with Jean-Michel Lasry, Pierre-Louis Lions, and Henri Verdier, Guéant founded a start-up called MFG-Labs, pioneering Big Data. The company was acquired by Havas Media in 2013.

From 2010 to 2015, Guéant served as Associate professor in applied mathematics at Paris Diderot University. He then briefly served as  Professor of Quantitative finance at ENSAE, and then accepted a Full Professorship of applied mathematics at the Sorbonne where he now serves.

His research on financial mathematics focuses on optimal execution and market making. He also worked with Roger Guesnerie, Jean-Michel Lasry and Olivier David Zerbib on environmental interest rates.

Between 2014 and 2017, Guéant was sitting on the Scientific Advisory Board of Havas Media.

Financial Mathematics & Market-making  
As an expert of financial mathematics and stochastic control, Guéant has published several books and articles on liquidity management, optimal orders execution and multi-asset market making. He is also an expert on pricing and asset management. Along with Charles-Albert Lehalle and Joaquin Fernandez-Tapia, he notably solved the Avellaneda-Stoikov equations, which are key to dealing with inventory risk in market making.

Books 
Paris-Princeton Lectures on Mathematical Finance 2010, 2011
The Financial Mathematics of Market Liquidity: From Optimal Execution to Market Making, 2016

Awards 
AAENSAE Prize for his research on environmental interest rates, 2008 (with Olivier David Zerbib)
Rosemont-Demassieux Prize for his PhD on mean field game theory, 2010
IEF-FBF Prize of the best paper in Finance, 2016 (with Charles-Albert Lehalle)

References

Year of birth missing (living people)
Living people
French mathematicians